was a Japanese waka poet and poetry scholar of the late Heian period.

Poetry

The following poem by him was included as No. 84 in Fujiwara no Teika's Ogura Hyakunin Isshu:

He was a member of the conservative Rokujō school of poetic composition, and Donald Keene has called him a "mediocre poet". Suzuki et al., however, say that his brilliant poetry scholarship put him at the top of the waka world in his day.

He was one of the first to apply rules of choosing themes, participants and judges in the uta-awase poetry gatherings. His standards of judging poetry, made him a rival of Fujiwara no Shunzei.

He compiled twenty books of 998 poems, a much larger anthology than its namesake, and submitted to the emperor expecting for it to be recognized as the seventh imperial anthology. The emperor died before its completion, and it remains consigned to the status of a private collection.
Ultimately ninety-four of his poems were included in imperial collections.

Scholarship

References

Bibliography

External links 
E-text of his poems in Japanese.

12th century in Japan
12th-century Japanese poets
1104 births
1177 deaths
Fujiwara clan
Hyakunin Isshu poets